Major Muhammad Akram  (4 April 1938 – 5 December 1971) was a military officer in the Pakistan Army who was cited with the Nishan-e-Haider posthumously after the military confrontation took place in railway station in Hilli, East-Pakistan.

Biography
Muhammad Akram  belongs to Dinga, a small city in Gujrat District. He was born on 4 April 1938. He was a military brat and his father, Malik S. Muhammad, was an enlisted personnel in the British Indian Army who later retired as a Havildar, an army n.c.o., in the Pakistan Army. 

After securing his graduation from a local middle school in Nakka Kalan, Akram entered to join the Military College Jhelum– an ROTC and an army's OCS in Jhelum, Punjab.

In 1953, he dropped out from the Military College Jhelum due to his father's deployment, and had to take the High School equivalency exam where he took examinations in geography and intermediate education. 

In 1956, he was enlisted in the Pakistan Army and posted with the 8th Punjab Regiment near India-Pakistan border.

In 1959, Muhammad Akram was selected to attend the Pakistan Military Academy but only spent a semester after being deployed in East-Pakistan as a Naik (equivalent to Corporal). 

He received commission in the Army through his years of attendance at the army's OCS in Jhelum in 1961 in the Frontier Force Regiment, and was attached to the East Pakistan Rifles from 1963 to 1965. 

In 1965, Capt. Akram was stationed in different parts of the West-Pakistan before being deployed in East-Pakistan as a quartermaster with the Frontier Force Regiment till 1967–68.

Nishan-e-Haider action
In 1968–70, Maj. Akram served with the 4th battalion posted with the Frontier Force Regiment, eventually becoming its second-in-command by 1971.

During the east Pakistan War of 1971, the 4th FF Regiment, which at that time was commanded by then Lt. Col. Muhammad Mumtaz Malik, was placed in the forward area of the Hilli Municipality (under Hakimpur Upazila, Dinajpur District), in what was then East Pakistan.  The regiment came under continuous and heavy air, artillery and armour attacks from the Indian Army. Despite enemy superiority in both numbers and firepower, Akram and his men repulsed many attacks, inflicting heavy casualties on the enemy. He was killed in action in the attack and was posthumously awarded the Nishan-e-Haider, Pakistan's highest military honour.

He was buried in the village of Boaldar, Thana/Upozila-Hakimpur (Banglahilly), District-Dinajpur. There is a monument, Major Akram Shaheed Memorial, in the midst of Jhelum city.

Awards and decorations

References

External links

1938 births
1971 deaths
Punjabi people
People from Gujrat District
People from Jhelum
Pakistan Military Academy alumni
Pakistan Army officers
People of East Pakistan
People of the Indo-Pakistani War of 1971
Pakistani military personnel killed in action
Recipients of Nishan-e-Haider
Hashemite people
Alids
Awan
Alvis